Frederick Arthur Barrett (12 April 1893–1968) was an English footballer who played in the Football League for Chelsea.

References

1893 births
1968 deaths
English footballers
Association football defenders
English Football League players
Belfast Celtic F.C. players
Chelsea F.C. players
Dundalk F.C. players
Ards F.C. players